The Ilam School of Fine Arts at the University of Canterbury was founded in 1882 as the Canterbury College School of Art. The school became a full department of the university in the 1950s, and was the first department to move to the suburban Ilam site in 1957, in the Okeover Homestead. Art history was included in 1974, and the Bachelor of Fine Arts degree was introduced in 1982.

Located in the Christchurch suburb of Ilam, it is informally called the Ilam School of Fine Arts, although this can lead to the school being confused with the Elam School of Fine Arts in Auckland.

Notable alumni

 Rita Angus 
 Kathleen Browne
 Russell Clark 
 Shane Cotton 
 Michael Dunn
 Dick Frizzell
 Pat Hanly
 Rhona Haszard
 Louise Henderson 
 Glenn Jowitt 
 Euan Macleod 
 Daisy Osborn (1888–1957)
 Vincent Ward
 Frances Rutherford

See also 
The Group

References
 A History of the University of Canterbury 1873-1973 by W.J. Gardner, E. T. Beardsley & T. E. Carter (Caxton Press, Christchurch, 1973)

External links
About the School of Fine Arts (University of Canterbury website)
School of Fine Arts collection (University of Canterbury website)
The School of Art (from 1885 Guide to Christchurch)

University of Canterbury
Educational institutions established in 1882
Art schools in New Zealand
1882 establishments in New Zealand